Yaba or YABA may refer to:

People 
Yaba is a female given name associated with the Akan people of West Africa, usually denoting a girl born on a Thursday.

Yaba Angelosi, South Sudanese American singer, songwriter, sound producer, film director, and entertainer
Yaba Badoe (born 1955), Ghanaian-British filmmaker, journalist and author
Yaba Blay (born 1974), Ghanaian-American professor, producer and publisher

Places 
, the capital of Yaba Department
Yaba, Lagos, a suburb of Lagos, Nigeria
 Yaba, Indonesia, a town in North Maluku, Indonesia

Other uses 
 Yaba or Ya ba, tablets of methamphetamine and caffeine popular in south-east Asia
 Yaba monkey tumor virus

Acronyms 
 Young American Bowling Alliance, one of the organisations that merged to form the United States Bowling Congress in 2005
 Albany Airport (Western Australia) in Albany, Western Australia
 Yet Another Bloody Acronym, see